= Aeronautical Emergency Communications System Plan =

In telecommunications, the Aeronautical Emergency Communications System Plan (AECS) provides for the operation of aeronautical communications stations, on a voluntary, organized basis, to provide the President and the Federal Government, as well as multiple heads of state and local governments, or their designated representatives, and the aeronautical industry with an expeditious means of communications during an emergency.
